Ayata Joseph (born 10 August 1985 in Antigua) is a triple jumper from Antigua and Barbuda.

Career

His personal best is 16.29 metres, achieved in July 2003 in Bridgetown.

Achievements

References

 

1985 births
Living people
Antigua and Barbuda male triple jumpers
Athletes (track and field) at the 2002 Commonwealth Games
Athletes (track and field) at the 2006 Commonwealth Games
Athletes (track and field) at the 2003 Pan American Games
Athletes (track and field) at the 2007 Pan American Games
Pan American Games competitors for Antigua and Barbuda
Commonwealth Games competitors for Antigua and Barbuda